Delhi Public School Azaad Nagar in Kanpur is a private school running under the aegis of Delhi Public School Society, New Delhi. It is a Senior Secondary School affiliated to the Central Board of Secondary Education (CBSE), New Delhi. DPS Azaad Nagar is located in Azaad Nagar on the historic Mainawati Marg in the industrial town of Kanpur and is a prominent landmark of the city and is situated near the city zoo.

History 

The first Delhi Public School in Kanpur was established at Servodaya Nagar, in the year 1997. However, as the students of the Primary School grew older and their need of a holistic development expanded, the management felt the need to have bigger premises for the Senior School and thus DPS Azaad Nagar was set up as an institution on Mainawati Marg on a vast expanse of land. The founder Headmistress of DPS Servodaya Nagar, Mrs. Rachna Mohotra moved on to DPS Azaad Nagar as the Principal of the Senior School. DPS Servodaya Nagar thereafter continues to function as a feeder school for DPS Azaad Nagar under the supervision and guidance of its Headmistress, Anju Verma.

Campus 

DPS Azaad Nagar, located in a sprawling, lush green, 20-acre campus, is a co- educational, day, and boarding school with more than 3,000 students.  The School consists of an Administrative Block and 3 Academic Blocks. The Primary Block has classes Playgroup to Class – V whereas the Middle Block resides Classes VI – VIII. The Senior Block consisting of Classes IX – XII provides the following streams: Science, Commerce and Humanities. Moreover, the school consists of a separate, air-conditioned boys’ and girls’ hostel within its premises that are headed by male and female wardens respectively. Besides the above, the school's infrastructure entails an amphitheater, a multipurpose hall, a floodlit playground, gymnasium, shooting range and an Olympic size swimming pool.

Other academic facilities available for students include laboratories for Computer, Physics, Chemistry, Biology, Language, and Mathematics as well as a well-equipped library. Moreover, the junior students have a separate Science Room and Computer Lab. For inculcating and fostering extra curricular activities among the students, the school provides separate classrooms for Music, Dance, Theatre, and Fine Arts.

Academic achievements 

The 100% success rate since the first Class X and XII Board result 2017 is a testimony to the above-mentioned fact. Moreover, DPS Azaad Nagar has won numerous laurels in academic, sports, dance, music and theatrical events at various Inter-DPS, Inter-School and National competitions. Albeit DPS Azaad Nagar is a young School, its alumni association boasts of engineers, doctors, designers, lawyers, and IAS aspirants in the making.
Arjav Jain of Delhi Public School, Azaad Nagar being awarded National Bal Shree Honour by Honorable HRD Minister Smriti Irani

Office Bearers

See also
 Delhi Public School Society
 List of schools in Kanpur
 DPS Barra
 Delhi Public School, Servodaya nagar
 Delhi Public School Kidwai Nagar

References

External links 
 
 DPS Azaad Nagar Official website
 DPS Servodaya Nagar Official website
 DPS Kidwai Nagar Official website
 DPS Family Official Website

Delhi Public School Society
Primary schools in Uttar Pradesh
High schools and secondary schools in Uttar Pradesh
Schools in Kanpur
Educational institutions established in 2004
2004 establishments in Uttar Pradesh